La Tocada is the 15th album by Mexican iconic pop singer Verónica Castro. It was released in 1997. Castro was filming both her late night show, La Tocada, and her telenovela, Pueblo chico, infierno grande, at this time. The theme song to the telenovela was "Pena De Amor Y Muerte".

Track listing

 "Ritmo De La Noche (La Tocada)" (A.B. Quintanilla, Juan Manuel)
 "Me Haces Falta Amor" (Abraham Quintanilla III, Juan Manuel)
 "Pero Como Voy A Olvidar" (Ricky Vela)
 "Camaron Que Se Duerme" (A.B. Quintanilla, Juan Manuel) 
 "Ya Me Voy" (Abraham Quintanilla III, Juan Manuel)
 "Que Tu Ya No Me Quieres" (Juan Manuel)
 "Acarcate A Mi" (Juan Manuel) 
 "Tengo Que Decirte Adios" (Abraham Quintanilla III, Juan Manuel) 
 "No Debo Amarte" (Ricky Vela)
 "Sueña Conmigo (Se Orgulloso)" (Abraham Quintanilla III, Pete Astudillo, Juan Manuel) 
 "Pena De Amor Y Muerte" (Juan Carlos Calderón)

Singles

1997 albums
Verónica Castro albums